The Sarah Berliner Research Fellowship for Women was established in 1908 by Emile Berliner in honor of his mother, and first awarded in 1909.  The fellowship was award biennially and provided $1200 to support a woman studying physics, chemistry, or biology in either America or Europe.  The fellowship was open to women holding the degree of doctor of philosophy or otherwise capable of conducting higher research.  The first chair of the awarding committee was Christine Ladd-Franklin, who was also instrumental in the establishment of the fellowship.  In 1911, an increase in funding meant that the fellowship could be offered every year.

Recipients
 1909: Caroline M. McGill, zoology
 1912: Gertrude Rand, psychology
 1916?: Ethel Browne Harvey, zoology
 1926: Hope Hibbard, biology and zoology
 1928: Sally Hughes-Schrader, zoology
 1934: Emma Margaret Dietz, chemistry
 1983: Margaret Lewis, physics
 [unknown date]: Carol Jane Anger Rieke, astronomy
 [unknown date]: Carlotta Maury, geology

References

Awards established in 1908
Science and technology awards
Fellowships